Whodunnit? was an American television game show based on the British game show of the same name. It aired on NBC from April 12 to May 17, 1979. hosted by Ed McMahon and featuring F. Lee Bailey and Melvin Belli as panelists. NBC billed the series as the first mystery game show. It attracted dismal ratings, ranking 111th out of 114 shows airing during the 1978–79 season, with an average 10.0/18 rating/share.

References

External links

1970s American game shows
1979 American television series debuts
1979 American television series endings
1970s American mystery television series
American panel games
NBC original programming
American television series based on British television series